Benjamin Robert Sigmund (born 3 February 1981) is a New Zealand former international footballer. He represented New Zealand at under-17, under-20 and senior level.

Club career
Born in Blenheim, Sigmund spent his early career with Football Kingz, Canterbury United, Fawkner Blues and Auckland City. He signed for the Wellington Phoenix in 2008. On 9 July 2012 he signed a two-year contract extension keep him with the club until 2015.

On 18 December 2015, Sigmund announced that he would retire from professional football at the end of the season.

He subsequently joined amateur side Cashmere Technical in 2016.

International career
Sigmund made his senior international debut as a substitute in August 2000 against Oman, but did not earn a second cap until 2007, where he earned a call up to play Wales in Wrexham after nearly seven years in the football wilderness.
On 6 September 2008 Sigmund scored his first international goal in a 3–1 win over New Caledonia with a header from a corner.

Sigmund was named as part of the 2009 FIFA Confederations Cup New Zealand squad to travel to South Africa, and was more recently in the side the beat Bahrain in the 2010 FIFA World Cup qualification match on 14 November 2009.

On 10 May 2010, Sigmund was named in New Zealand's final 23-man squad to compete at the 2010 FIFA World Cup.

On 29 September 2014, Sigmund retired from international football citing his desire to spend more time with his family.

Honours
Personal Honours:
 Wellington Phoenix Member's Player of the Year: 2008–2009

References

External links
 Ben Sigmund Interview 
 
 NZF – All White profile
 
 

1981 births
Living people
New Zealand association footballers
New Zealand international footballers
Canterbury United players
Football Kingz F.C. players
Auckland City FC players
Wellington Phoenix FC players
Sportspeople from Blenheim, New Zealand
A-League Men players
New Zealand Football Championship players
Association football central defenders
2008 OFC Nations Cup players
2009 FIFA Confederations Cup players
2010 FIFA World Cup players
2012 OFC Nations Cup players